The Eureka Union School District is a primary education school district in Placer County, California overseeing schools for kindergarten through 8th grade in parts of East Roseville and Granite Bay.

Schools

Pre School
Olive Ranch School, no longer operating as a school.
Oakhills School
Greenhills School

Kindergraden-Grade 3
Greenhills School
Oakhills School
Maidu School

Grade 4-Grade 6
Ridgeview School
Excelsior School
Eureka School, no longer operating as a school.

Junior high schools
Olympus Junior High School
Cavitt Junior High School

References

Ridgeview Eco-Lab

Teachers behind it
The Ridgeview Ecolab was created by Jennifer & Stephen Kinloch; married teachers. It was made over 8 years ago and can be found in the top left of the school field.
The rest of the Ridgeview 6th grade team is also behind this massive project. Shannon Prior, Ryan Davey, Leslie Ashby, Chelsea Hirsch, and Radford Peterson all 6th
grade teachers at Ridgeview, help keep this amazing place alive.

External links
 

School districts in Placer County, California
Roseville, California